A whole grain is a grain of any cereal and pseudocereal that contains the  endosperm, germ, and bran, in contrast to refined grains, which retain only the endosperm.

As part of a general healthy diet, consumption of whole grains is associated with lower risk of several diseases. Whole grains are a source of carbohydrates, multiple nutrients and dietary fiber.

Varieties 

Whole grain sources include:

Cereals
 Wheat (spelt, emmer, farro, einkorn, Kamut, durum)
 Rice (Black rice, brown, red, and other colored rice varieties)
 Barley (hulled and dehulled but not pearl)
 Maize or Corn
 Rye
 Oats (including hull-less or naked oats)

Minor cereals
 Millets
 Sorghum
 Teff
 Triticale
 Canary grass
 Job's tears
 Fonio, black fonio, Asian millet
 Wild rice

Pseudocereals
 Amaranth
 Buckwheat, Tartary buckwheat
 Quinoa

Health effects

Nutrition
Whole grains are a source of multiple nutrients and dietary fiber, recommended for children and adults in several daily servings containing a variety of foods that meet whole grain-rich criteria. As components of breakfast cereals, whole grains are associated with improved micronutrient intake and lower risk of several diseases. Their effects on gastrointestinal health, risk of obesity and cognition need further evaluation.

Cereal proteins have low quality, due to deficiencies in essential amino acids, mainly lysine. Supplementation of cereals with proteins from other food sources (mainly legumes) is commonly used to compensate for this deficiency, since the limitation of a single essential amino acid causes the others to break down and become excreted, which is especially important during the period of growth. In contrast, the proteins of the pseudocereals have a high nutritional value, close to those of casein (the main protein in milk). Quinoa and amaranth are the most nutritious grains due to their high content and quality of proteins, with high levels of lysine and other essential amino acids.

Disease risk
Manufacturers of foods containing whole grains in specified amounts are allowed a health claim for marketing purposes in the United States, stating: "low fat diets rich in fiber-containing grain products, fruits, and vegetables may reduce the risk of some types of cancer, a disease associated with many factors" and "diets low in saturated fat and cholesterol and rich in fruits, vegetables, and grain products that contain some types of dietary fiber, particularly soluble fiber, may reduce the risk of heart disease, a disease associated with many factors". The scientific opinion of the European Food Safety Authority (EFSA) related to health claims on gut health or bowel function, weight control, blood glucose and insulin levels, weight management, blood cholesterol, satiety, glycemic index, digestive function and cardiovascular health is "that the food constituent, whole grain, (...) is not sufficiently characterised in relation to the claimed health effects" and "that a cause and effect relationship cannot be established between the consumption of whole grain and the claimed effects considered in this opinion."

By supplying high dietary fiber content, as part of a general healthy diet, consumption of whole grains may lower risk of several diseases, including coronary heart disease, stroke, cancer and type 2 diabetes, with lower all-cause mortality. Regular whole-grain consumption may lower elevated LDL and triglyceride levels, which are risk factors for cardiovascular diseases. In addition, some older evidence indicates whole-grain consumption is inversely related to hypertension, diabetes, and obesity when compared to refined grains, all of which are negative indicators in total cardiovascular health. However, a 2017 review found insufficient evidence for a relationship between whole grain consumption and lowered risk of cardiovascular diseases.

Gluten concerns
In genetically susceptible people, gluten (proteins found in wheat, barley, rye, oat, and related species and hybrids) can trigger coeliac disease. Coeliac disease affects about 1% of the general population in developed countries. There is evidence that most cases remain undiagnosed and untreated. The only known effective treatment is a strict lifelong gluten-free diet. Minor cereals and pseudocereals may be a reasonable alternative to replace gluten-containing cereals for people who need to follow a gluten-free diet.

While coeliac disease is caused by a reaction to wheat proteins, it is not the same as a wheat allergy. Other diseases triggered by eating gluten are non-coeliac gluten sensitivity, (estimated to affect 0.5% to 13% of the general population), gluten ataxia and dermatitis herpetiformis.

Regulations 
In the United States wholegrain products can be identified by the ingredients list. "Wheat flour" (as opposed to "wholegrain wheat flour" or "whole-wheat flour") as the first ingredient is not a clear indicator of the product's wholegrain content.  If two ingredients are listed as grain products but only the second is listed as wholegrain, the entire product may contain between 1% and 49% wholegrain.  Many breads are colored brown (often with molasses or caramel color) and made to look like wholegrain when they are not. In addition, some food manufacturers make foods with wholegrain ingredients, but, because wholegrain ingredients are not the dominant ingredient, they are not wholegrain products. Contrary to popular belief, wholegrains are not indicative of fiber. The amount of fiber varies from grain to grain, and some products may have things like bran, peas, or other foods added to boost the fiber content.

From AACC (American Association of Cereal Chemists) definition: "Whole grains shall consist of the intact, ground, cracked or flaked caryopsis, whose principal anatomical components - the starchy endosperm, germ and bran - are present in the same relative proportions as they exist in the intact caryopsis."

U.S. standards of identity 
The following names indicate whole-grain products, in accordance with the federal government:
 "Whole wheat bread"
 "Whole millet"
 "Whole wheat buns"
 "Whole wheat macaroni"
 "Whole wheat spaghetti"
 "Whole wheat vermicelli"
 "Cracked wheat" (as an ingredient, not part of a name, as in "cracked wheat bread")
 "Crushed wheat"
 "Whole wheat flour"
 "Graham flour" (as an ingredient, not as part of a name as in "graham crackers")
 "Entire wheat flour"
 "Bromated whole wheat flour"
 "Whole durum flour"
 "Bulgur (cracked wheat)" ("bulgur" by itself may or may not indicate whole grain, and "cracked wheat" is not synonymous with bulgur)

Canadian standards of identity 
There are multiple grains such as cereal grains (e.g. wheat, rice, oats, barley, corn, wild rice, and rye) as well as pseudocereals (e.g. quinoa and buckwheat) that may be labeled whole grains.

When wheat is milled to make flour, the parts of the grain are usually separated and then are recombined to make specific types of flour, such as whole wheat, whole grain, white cake and pastry flour, and all-purpose white flour. If all parts of the kernel are used in the same relative proportions as they exist in the original kernel, then the flour is considered whole grain.

Under the Food and Drug Regulations, up to 5% of the kernel can be removed to help reduce rancidity and prolong the shelf life of whole-wheat flour. The portion of the kernel that is removed for this purpose contains much of the germ and some of the bran. If this portion of the kernel has been removed, the flour would no longer be considered whole grain.

UK regulations
In the UK the legally protected term is wholemeal rather than wholegrain. There are voluntary guidelines on what can be labelled a wholegrain product.

See also 
 Ancient grains
 Alkylresorcinols
 Refined grains
 Unifine mill
 Wheatberry
 Whole foods
 Whole grain stamp

References

External links 
 Article from BBC news
 Definition of Whole Grain
 Tips For Preventing Insulin Resistance
 U.S. FDA Guidance on Whole Grain Label Statements (Draft)

 
Cereals